Khaled Shafiei (born January 29, 1987) is an Iranian football defender currently plays for Bangladesh Premier League side Bashundhara Kings.

Career
Shafiei joined Fajr Sepasi in 2010 after spending the previous season in Kowsar.

He joined FC Seoul on 25 June 2017, becoming the first Iranian player in K League.

Club career statistics

Honours

Tractor
 Persian Gulf Pro League runner-up: 2014–15
Bashundhara Kings
Bangladesh Federation Cup: 2020–21

References

External links 
Khaled Shafiei at PersianLeague.com

1987 births
Living people
Iranian footballers
Association football defenders
Fajr Sepasi players
Naft Tehran F.C. players
Tractor S.C. players
Zob Ahan Esfahan F.C. players
FC Seoul players
K League 1 players
Iranian expatriate footballers
Expatriate footballers in South Korea
Iranian expatriate sportspeople in South Korea
Bashundhara Kings players